Hans Peter Haselsteiner (born 1 February 1944, in Wörgl) is an Austrian industrialist and former politician.

Education 
After his Matura, Hans Peter Haselsteiner studied business economics at the Vienna University of Economics and Business, from where he graduated in 1970.

Industrial background 
After working some time as an accountant, he joined his father-in-law's contracting business, Isola & Lerchbaumer (later Ilbau) in 1972. Through a series of takeovers, he expanded the company, now known as Strabag, into an international concern, which he controls through the holding company FIMAG (Finanz Industrie Management AG), of which he is the majority shareholder.
 At the beginning of the 70's, he became chairman of Ilbau AG
 In 1998, he became chairman of Bau Holding.
 In 2006 he became chairman of Strabag SE.
 Haselsteiner is shareholder and director of the Rail Holding AG, which operates the WESTbahn train, a passenger train competing with ÖBB between Vienna and Salzburg.

June 2012, Haselsteiner announced he would resign his executive position in Strabag in June 2014.

Political involvement 
Hans Peter Haselsteiner was an MP in the Nationalrat from 1994 to 1998, under the banner of the Liberal Forum (LiF), of which he became club vice-chairman in 1996.
Other positions included:

 "Kammerrat" (consellor) of the Austrian Federal Chamber of technical Economics
 member of the Austrian association of the Building industry since 1994 (chairman since 2002).

During the Austrian legislative elections in September 2008, Haselsteiner was responsible for finance for the Lif. He was also chairman of the support committee to the party leader Heide Schmidt, who was chosen after the resignation of Alexander Zach five days before the election. The poll was lost, and Schmidt and Haselsteiner retired from political activity later that year, announcing the failure of the LiF project.

In 2016 he funded a campaign against FPÖ politician Norbert Hofer, who candidated for President.

He also gave financial contributions to NEOS Party in the Austrian national elections of 2017.

Philanthropy 
After the failure of the LiF, Haselsteiner supported the Institut für eine offene Gesellschaft (Institute for an open Society), founded by Heide Schmidt.

Haselsteiner is also deeply involved in helping homeless people. He promoted the construction of 16 social housing projects in Vienna.

His private foundation funds half of the budget of father Georg Sorschill's social center for elderly and needy people in Moldova (the other half is funded by the Austrian state).

In Summer 2008, he gave a substantial donation to save the refugee project of Ute Bock in Vienna.

Helicopter crash 
In November 2021, Haselsteiner's helicopter (a Bell 429 registered OE-XCE) crashed during landing at Vienna Neustadt East Airport. The pilot, a 50-year-old from Carinthia, was killed. Haselsteiner had disembarked the helicopter in Semmering a few minutes before the crash. The flight had originated in Bolzano, Italy.

References 

1944 births
Living people
Austrian politicians
Austrian industrialists
Vienna University of Economics and Business alumni